The Bodyguard's Cure is a 2006 Italian neo-noir film directed by Carlo Arturo Sigon.

Cast 

 Claudio Bisio: Sandrone
 Stefania Rocca: Vera
 Ernest Borgnine: Jerry Warden
 Antonio Catania: Giò Pesce
 Gigio Alberti: Luke
 Bebo Storti: Gipi
 Kledi Kadiu: Adrian

References

External links

2006 films
Italian crime films
2000s crime films
Italian neo-noir films
2006 directorial debut films
2000s Italian films